Spike & Dru is a trade paperback collecting comic stories based on the Buffy The Vampire Slayer television series. The book contains four stories, all starring the characters Spike and Drusilla.

All's Fair

In 1933, Spike and Dru are at the World's Fair. However, some very vengeful and deadly vampire hunters want vengeance against Spike for killing their relative Xin Rong.

The Queen of Hearts

Spike and Dru are travelling to Sunnydale, but first stop off at St. Louis to try some riverboat gambling. The detour ends up less relaxing than they might have hoped.

Set before Buffy season 2 episode "School Hard".

Paint the Town Red

Spike is irritated by Drusilla's passion for Angelus. Their relationship comes to a heated end and Spike goes to Turkey for a break. Dru hunts him down with someone new, a necromancer. She wants to even the score but soon makes trouble for everyone.

Set after Buffy season 2 episode "Becoming, Part Two".

This story is co-authored by James Marsters, who played Spike on the Buffy the Vampire Slayer television show.

Who Made Who

Spike and Dru are a newly made up couple in Brazil. Yet Dru's attention once again drifts away and Spike spoils some partying.

Set in Buffy season 3, after the episode "Lovers Walk".

This ten page short story originally appeared in the comic one shot "Lovers Walk".

See also

Spike & Dru novel

Pretty Maids All in a Row

Spike comics

Old Times
Spike vs Dracula
Old Wounds
Lost and Found
Asylum
Shadow Puppets

Spike novels

Blackout
Spark and Burn

External links
BBC - Cult - Buffy the Vampure Slayer Ecomics The above comic is available for free as an ecomic at the BBC website.

Comics based on Buffy the Vampire Slayer